Isaac Success Ajayi (born 7 January 1996)  is a Nigerian professional footballer who plays as a forward for Serie A club Udinese.

Club career
Success was born in Benin City. He started his career with local side BJ Foundation Academy appearing regularly for the side.

In November 2013 Success agreed to a five-year deal with Udinese, starting January 2014, for a €400,000 fee. However, he was only granted a work permit in March of the following year, and immediately joined Granada CF, being assigned to the reserves in Segunda División B.

On 31 August 2014, Success made his first-team debut, starting in a 1–1 away draw against Elche CF at the age of 18 years and seven months, being their youngest player ever to appear in a La Liga match. He scored his first professional goal on 7 December, netting his side's only of a home draw against Valencia CF, for the same scoreline. On 7 August 2015, Success extended his link with the club, signing until 2019 and being permanently promoted to the main squad.

On 1 July 2016, Success agreed a five-year deal with Watford in a record transfer fee, estimated around £12.5 million from Granada. He scored once in 19 appearances in the 2016–17 season and, after just one appearance in 2017–18 was loaned to Malaga on 31 January 2018.

On 26 August 2021, Success signed for Italian club Udinese on a three-year deal.

International career
In 2013 Success was called up to Nigeria under-17's for the year's FIFA U-17 World Cup, being also named vice-captain. He appeared in the first two games, but was sidelined during the rest of the tournament due to an injury. Success got his first call up to the senior Nigeria side for a 2018 FIFA World Cup qualifier against Zambia in October 2016. On 23 March 2017, Success made his debut for Nigeria, coming on as a substitute in a 1–1 draw against Senegal at The Hive Stadium in London.

Career statistics

Club

Honours
Watford
FA Cup runner-up: 2018–19

References

External links

1996 births
Living people
Sportspeople from Benin City
Nigerian footballers
Association football forwards
Nigeria international footballers
Nigeria youth international footballers
Nigeria under-20 international footballers
La Liga players
Segunda División B players
Premier League players
Serie A players
Club Recreativo Granada players
Granada CF footballers
Watford F.C. players
Málaga CF players
Udinese Calcio players
Nigerian expatriate footballers
Expatriate footballers in Spain
Expatriate footballers in England
Expatriate footballers in Italy
Nigerian expatriate sportspeople in Spain
Nigerian expatriate sportspeople in England
Nigerian expatriate sportspeople in Italy
FA Cup Final players